

Elphege (or Ælfheah; died  1003) was a medieval Bishop of Lichfield.

Elphege was consecrated in 975 and died between 1002 and 1004.

Citations

References

External links
 

1000s deaths
10th-century English bishops
11th-century English Roman Catholic bishops
Anglo-Saxon bishops of Lichfield
Year of birth unknown